Lizz Tayler (born June 9, 1990) is an American former pornographic actress.

Early life and career
Born in Arizona, Tayler debuted in the adult industry in March 2010. Her stage name comes from Elizabeth Taylor, who Tayler finds "very classy, yet...promiscuous at the same time". Tayler played softball for 14 years and ran cross country when she was younger, and she currently likes hiking & swimming.

A fan of pornographic actress Briana Banks, Tayler has Banks' signature tattooed on her own abdomen.

In October 2010, the company Bottles-Up Inc. launched a signature cocktail named after her. Tayler has appeared in a music video with rap artist JMC and in the music video of the song "2 Cups" by Lil Debbie. She also was a guest in The Friday Night 3-Way, In Bed With Jessica Drake, and The Morning Show With Andrea and Kevin on Playboy Radio.

In 2011, Tayler was a "Heart-On Girl" at the XRCO Awards Show, where she was nominated as Best New Starlet.

Awards and nominations
 2011 XBIZ Award nominee – New Starlet of the Year
 2011 XRCO Award nominee – New Starlet
 2012 AVN Award nominee – Best New Starlet
 2012 AVN Award nominee – Best Three-Way Sex Scene, G/B/B (Anarchy - Wicked Pictures) with Danny Wylde & Sascha
 2013 AVN Award nominee – Best POV Sex Scene (Barely Legal POV 11 - Hustler Video) with Eric John

Further reading

References

External links

 
 
 
 

1990 births
Actresses from Phoenix, Arizona
Pornographic film actors from Arizona
Living people
21st-century American women